Società Sportiva Dilettantistica Acqua e Sapone Calcio a 5 is a futsal club based in Città Sant'Angelo, Abruzzo, Italy.

History
In 2000 Pescheto C/5 was founded, an amateur futsal sports association. It was the brainchild of six friends returning from a holiday in Brazil that gave life to a dream they had to bring a team to Città Sant'Angelo. In 2007 this team would merge with City Marina S. Angelo to create ASD Acqua e Sapone Marina CSA.

The team had quick successes from 2002 to 2005 with winning promotion from Serie D, Serie C2, and Serie C1. In 2005/06, their first season in Serie B, the team finished second in their group and missed being promoted through the playoff by not getting past the quarterfinals. In 2006/07 they finished in fourth place and missed out on the playoffs. After the merger in 2007 Acqua e Sapone finished first in their group and earned automatic promotion to Serie A2.

In the 2009/10 season the team excelled and won direct promotion to Serie A. Acqua e Sapone also made their first appearance in a cup final that season by participating in the Final Eight Serie A2 in which they lost in the final to Gruppo Fassina 2–1.

The team's first silverware from the top level came in 2013/14 when they won the Coppa Italia by beating Lazio 3–1 in the final. The next season they then defeated Luparense 6–1 to win the Supercoppa Italiana.

Chronology

Current squad

Famous players
 Stefano Mammarella
 Murilo Ferreira
 Fernando Leitão
 Leandro Cuzzolino

Honours
 Coppa Italia:  2014
 Supercoppa Italiana: 2014

References

External links
Official Website

Futsal clubs in Italy
Sport in Abruzzo
2000 establishments in Italy
Futsal clubs established in 2000